Fergal Bowers (born November 1961) is an Irish journalist. He is the health correspondent for RTÉ News. Previously he worked as an editor for Irish Medical News from 1988 to 2000, and irishhealth.com from 2000 to 2004.

Career
Bowers began his career as an editor for Irish Medical News in 1988 and won an ESB National Media Award in 1996. On 31 October 2000, it was announced that he would be a new editor for Ireland's independent health website irishhealth.com. In August 2004, he was appointed by RTÉ to the senior position of health correspondent.

References

1961 births
Living people
Irish journalists
RTÉ newsreaders and journalists